"Runaway" is a song recorded, written and produced by New York City-based group Deee-Lite, released on May 28, 1992 by Elektra Records as the lead single from their second studio album, Infinity Within (1992). It is the group's fourth single to top the US Billboard Dance Club Songs chart. In Europe, the song was a top 10 hit in Greece and a top 20 hit in Finland, as well as peaking at number nine on the UK Dance Singles Chart and number 12 on the European Dance Radio Chart.

Critical reception
Heather Phares from AllMusic named the song one of her "Track Picks" from the Infinity Within album. Larry Flick from Billboard noted that Lady Miss Kier "has evolved into a far more confident diva, while cohorts Super DJ Dmitry and Jungle DJ Towa Towa keep an ear to current sounds while maintaining a reverence for retro funk and disco." Dave Sholin from the Gavin Report felt it "stays in the uptempo groove with that House intensity that's sure to make it a club as well as radio favorite." Melody Maker concluded that "Deee-Lite, along with C&C Music Factory, are still the most up-to-date mainstream American dance act". A reviewer from Music & Media said, "During their absence another weird trio—Army of Lovers—took over the reins. But now the dance loonies are back, although not as odd ball as before and more mainstream." 

Alan Jones from Music Week stated, "Still looking outlandish, Deee-Lite slide closer to the dance mainstream with "Runaway", a hustling garage groover that sounds like it was mixed by either Steve Hurley or Joey Negro, though neither was actually involved." Davydd Chong from the RM Dance Update described the song as "a reviving breath of fresh air", complimenting its "soothing keyboard riffs" and "candy-encased vocals". Sian Pattenden from Smash Hits gave it five out of five and named it Best New Single, commenting, "They're back! With a stomping curlicue in the lustrous toupee of pop! Housey backbeat combined with chomping bass and swishy pingy sounds amongst Lady Miss Kier's vocals de gusto". Joe Brown from The Washington Post felt that the "deceptively slight melodic hooks" of "Runaway" "prove infuriatingly tenacious."

Music video
The accompanying music video for "Runaway" was directed by American filmmaker and artist Gus Van Sant.

Track listing and formats
 German CD maxi-single
 "Runaway" (Sampladelic Radio Edit) – 3:52
 "Runaway" (Greyhound Extended Mix) – 5:40
 "Rubber Lover" (Skin Tight Mix) – 4:29
 "Runaway" (Masters at Work Dub) – 6:37

Charts

References

1992 singles
1992 songs
Dance-pop songs
Deee-Lite songs
Elektra Records singles
Songs written by Towa Tei